İnpınar is a village in the Beşiri District of Batman Province in Turkey. The village is populated by Kurds of the Reşkotan and Sinikan tribes and had a population of 231 in 2021.

The hamlet of Alıçlı is attached to the village.

References 

Villages in Beşiri District
Kurdish settlements in Batman Province